In geometry, the great complex icosidodecahedron is a degenerate uniform star polyhedron. It has 12 vertices, and 60 (doubled) edges, and 32 faces, 12 pentagrams and 20 triangles.  All edges are doubled (making it degenerate), sharing 4 faces, but are considered as two overlapping edges as topological polyhedron.

It can be constructed from a number of different vertex figures.

As a compound 

The great complex icosidodecahedron can be considered a compound of the small stellated dodecahedron, {5/2,5}, and great icosahedron, {3,5/2}, sharing the same vertices and edges, while the second is hidden, being completely contained inside the first.

{|
|

See also
Small complex icosidodecahedron
Small complex rhombicosidodecahedron
Complex rhombidodecadodecahedron
Great complex rhombicosidodecahedron

References 
 (Table 6, degenerate cases)
 
 

Polyhedra
Polyhedral compounds